Patrick Picot (born 22 September 1951) is a French fencer. He won a gold medal in the team épée at the 1980 Summer Olympics. He was also the vice-president of the French Fencing Federation from 2004 to 2008.

References

External links
 

1951 births
Living people
French male épée fencers
Olympic fencers of France
Fencers at the 1980 Summer Olympics
Olympic gold medalists for France
Olympic medalists in fencing
Medalists at the 1980 Summer Olympics